Thomas Roussel (born November 22, 1985 in Amiens) is a French former professional ice hockey defenceman who played at the 2009 IIHF World Championship as a member of the France National men's ice hockey team.

Career
Roussel was added to the roster of The Arizona Sundogs of the Central Hockey League for the 2009-10 season. Roussel had previously played in France for the last season and had skated in France for his entire playing career before joining the Sundogs.

The defenceman had appeared in 140 regular season games with Amiens, recording eight goals, 23 assists and 221 penalty minutes (PIM). Roussel set career highs in goals (3), assists (11) and penalty minutes (99) last season. In 33 combined tournament and playoff contests, he collected eight points (3g/5a) and 52 PIM.

Roussel was 23 years old when he started for the Sundogs and is 6-foot and weighed 187-pounds. Roussel who is a native of France also appeared in six games with Team France during the 2009 International Ice Hockey Federation (IIHF) World Championships in Switzerland. He had one assist and two PIM in six games.

See also

Arizona Sundogs
France men's national ice hockey team
2009 IIHF World Championship rosters

References

External links

International Ice Hockey Federation (IIHF)
Thomas Roussel's profile and stats at Arizona Sundogs official site

1985 births
Living people
Arizona Sundogs players
Ducs de Dijon players
French ice hockey defencemen
Gothiques d'Amiens players
LHC Les Lions players
Sportspeople from Amiens